Shadowcliff, also known as the Fellowship of Reconciliation Headquarters, is a historic home located at Upper Nyack, Rockland County, New York. It was built in 1921, and is a large two-story, Classical Revival style masonry dwelling. The 44-room residence features three porticoes, Palladian windows, and has a clay tile roof.  It has housed the headquarters of the Fellowship of Reconciliation since 1957.

It was listed on the National Register of Historic Places in 2014.

References

External links

Houses on the National Register of Historic Places in New York (state)
Neoclassical architecture in New York (state)
Houses completed in 1921
Houses in Rockland County, New York
National Register of Historic Places in Rockland County, New York